Cross Keys High School is a public high school in Georgia, United States which opened in 1958. It is located at 1626 North Druid Hills Road NE in the city of Brookhaven, near Atlanta, on the western edge of DeKalb County. It serves students from the Buford Highway Corridor in Brookhaven, Chamblee, and Doraville in the DeKalb County School System.

Demographics
For the 2016–2017 school year the student body was 86% Hispanic, 6% Black, 7% Asian, and 1% White.  It is the most culturally diverse high school in the state, with students from 65 countries who speak 75 different languages.

1,547 students were in attendance for the 2016–2017 school year. Of those, 1,330 were reported to be economically disadvantaged.

Academics
Cross Keys High School's overall performance is higher than 62% of schools in the state and is higher than its district. Its students' academic growth is higher than 99% of schools in the state and higher than its district.

Cross Keys was selected as a Georgia School of Excellence in 1996.

Athletics
The school's teams compete as the Indians. The football team plays at Adams Memorial Stadium.

External links
 School website

References

Education in Brookhaven, Georgia
DeKalb County School District high schools